Milan Skřont (24 November 1930 – 15 April 1994) was a Czech racewalker. He competed in the men's 50 kilometres walk at the 1956 Summer Olympics.

References

External links
 

1930 births
1994 deaths
Athletes (track and field) at the 1956 Summer Olympics
Czech male racewalkers
Olympic athletes of Czechoslovakia
Sportspeople from Opava